The Kingfisher is an oil on canvas painting by the Dutch artist Vincent van Gogh. It was painted from July to December 1886. The Kingfisher was painted in Paris, France. It is now located in Amsterdam, Netherlands, at the Van Gogh Museum.

The Kingfisher shows a River Kingfisher in a marsh. The bird is facing the right of the painting. The name "Vincent" is in the lower left corner of the painting.

See also

List of works by Vincent van Gogh

External links

Paintings by Vincent van Gogh
1886 paintings